The Krasue, known as Ahp in Cambodia; as Kasu in Laos; as Kuyang, Leak, Pelasik, Pelesit, or Penanggalan in Indonesia; as Penanggal in Malaysia, Indonesia, Brunei and Singapore; as Manananggal in the Philippines; as Ma lai in Vietnam; is a nocturnal female spirit of Southeast Asian folklore. It manifests itself as a woman, usually young and beautiful, with her internal organs hanging down from the neck, trailing below the head.

According to Thai ethnographer Phraya Anuman Rajadhon, the Krasue consists of a floating head accompanied by a will-o'-the-wisp kind of luminescent glow. The explanations attempted about the origin of the glow include the presence of methane in marshy areas. The Krasue is often said to live in the same areas as Krahang, a male spirit of the Thai folklore.

This spirit moves about by hovering in the air above the ground, for it has no lower body. The throat may be represented in different ways, either as only the trachea or with the whole neck. The organs below the head usually include the heart and the stomach with a length of intestine, the intestinal tract emphasizing the ghost's voracious nature. In the Thai movie Krasue Valentine, this ghost is represented with more internal organs, such as lungs and liver, but much reduced in size and anatomically out of proportion with the head. The viscera are sometimes represented freshly daubed with blood, as well as glowing. In contemporary representations her teeth often include pointed fangs in yakkha or vampire fashion. In the movie Ghosts of Guts Eater she has a halo around her head.Krasue has been the subject of a number of movies in the region, including My Mother Is Arb. Also known as Krasue Mom, this Cambodian horror film has the distinction of being the first movie made in the People's Republic of Kampuchea after the absence of locally-made movies and the repression of local folklore in Cambodia during the Khmer Rouge era.

The Krasue is also found in the popular mythology of Malaysia, where it is called as the balan-balan,  penanggalan or hantu penanggal, and also in Indonesia where it has many names such as Leyak, Palasik, Selaq Metem, Kuyang, Poppo/pokpok, and Parakang. This spirit is also part of Vietnamese folklore as ma lai via the minority ethnic groups of Vietnam's Central Highlands. In the Philippines there is a similar ghost, manananggal, a local spirit that haunts pregnant women. The spirit has also been referred to in many social media videos making it a "scary monster" on social media.

Legends

Origin
Belief in the existence of the Krasue is shared across Southeast Asia, and its origin is difficult to verify. However, it likely originates from folklore. In Thailand, the Krasue is believed to be a cursed individual (usually a female) who engaged in various sins and fraudulent conducts during her previous life. After she dies, her sins cause her to be reborn as a phuti that has to live off wasted, uncooked or rotten food. In recent time, the Thai entertainment industry has fictionalized the origin of Krasue as cursed from an Ancient Khmer princess, as in Demonic Beauty (2002). The kidnapped princess of the Khmer kingdom cheated on her husband (the general), with a soldier. The soldier was decapitated while the Khmer princess was burned to death. However, before she died, she chanted a spell to protect her mortal body but was only able to save her head and her organs. 
This depiction, however, merely is just an attempt to put a royal touch or to reinvent a mythical beginning to a well-known story of an essentially folk origin, strictly for entertainment and commercial purpose. 
One critic notes that the director of Demonic Beauty probably just wanted to depict "Krasue" as an evil alien demon, originating from the witchcraft and black magic of a foreign (i.e. Cambodian's) Pagan Culture, which is ultimately subdued and defeated by the more-enlightened Buddhist Culture of Thailand.

There are other oral traditions that say that this spirit was formerly a rich lady that had a length of black gauze or ribbon tied around the head and neck as protection from the sunlight. This woman was then possessed by an evil spirit and was cursed to become a Krasue. Other popular legends claim that the origin of the spirit may have been a woman trying to learn black magic that made a mistake or used the wrong spell so that her head and body became separated. Past sins are also related to the transmission of the Krasue curse; women who aborted or killed someone in a previous life will become a Krasue as punishment. Other folk stories talk about a person being cursed to become a Krasue after having consumed food and drink contaminated with a krasue's saliva or flesh. Popular imagination also claims that the transformation into a Krasue is largely restricted to the relatives of women practicing witchcraft "Mae Mot" (แม่มด) or "Yai Mot" (ยายมด), especially their daughters or granddaughters. Often women acting strangely in a community are suspected of becoming nightly a Krasue by other members of the village.

Cambodian folklore
The word អាប (Ahp/Aap), derived from a Sanskrit word आप्यति (āpyati, “to cause anyone to suffer”).https://en.wiktionary.org/wiki/%E1%9E%A2%E1%9E%B6%E1%9E%94  Ahp in Cambodian folklore, is usually a woman who is half spirit and half-mortal. During the daytime, they appeared to look like normal human beings but during nighttime they ascended, leaving their mortal body with only their head and their organs, gravitating to find food. They were believed to feast on smelly things; blood, raw meats, villager's farm animals, corpses, feces, placentas, newborns, etc. Their weaknesses are thorns and guard dogs.

Ahp are witches who failed practicing powerful black magic, causing it to backfired cursing themselves. Others believe that Ahp are black magic practitioners, borrowing a demon(evil spirit)'s power by letting them possess their body  at night, as an exchanged. "Ahp" have to pass their curse onto another woman to be able to enter the cycle of reincarnation; it could be their daughter, granddaughter, relatives or any other women that is in their womanhood also practicing witchcraft but some believe it could just be passed through the exchanged of bodily fluid to any women, usually tricked. Witches in khmer are called, "mae thmob" ម៉ែធ្មប់ (mother witch) "yeay thmob" យាយធ្មប់ (grandmother witch).

In order to protect pregnant women and their child from becoming victims, their relatives place thorny branches around the house as a barrier. This improvised thorny fence discourages the Ahp from coming to suck the blood and causing other suffering to the pregnant woman. After delivery, the woman's relatives must take the cut placenta far away for burial to hide it from the Ahp. If the placenta is buried deep enough the spirit would not be able to find it. It is believed that it would bring great calamities to the child and its family if an Ahp ate the mother's placenta.

Thai folklore
The Krasue is under a curse that makes it ever hungry and always active in the night when it goes out hunting to satisfy its gluttony, seeking blood to drink or raw flesh to devour. It may attack cattle or chickens in the darkness, drinking their blood and eating their internal organs. It may also prey on pieces of cattle, such as water buffalo that have died of other causes during the night. If blood is not available the Krasue may eat feces or carrion. Clothes left outside would be found soiled with blood and excrement in the morning, allegedly after she had wiped her mouth. Therefore, villagers would not leave clothes hanging to dry outside during the night hours.

The Krasue hides the headless body from which it originates in a quiet place because it needs to join it before daybreak, living like a normal person during the day, although having a sleepy look. To crush the still headless body of the krasue is fatal to the spirit. The flying head will return after hunting but rejoin with the wrong body which will lead it to suffer torment until death. If the top part of the body fails to find the lower half before daybreak it will die in terrible pain. The Krasue will also die if its intestines get cut off or if its body disappears or gets hidden by someone. Some folk beliefs hold that the creature can be destroyed by burning it. The main foes of the Krasue are mobs of angry villagers carrying torches and machetes. They may catch the Krasue and kill it or watch where she goes before dawn and destroy her body.

There is a legend said that the people who are wounded should be aware of the Krasue because it can smell the blood and will come to eat the blood at night when people fall asleep. However, there are ways to prevent the Krasue from coming inside the house. House-owners usually build spiky fences or grow spiky bamboo to protect themselves from the Krasue. Krasue is scared of spiky things because its intestine might get stuck and it could not escape.

21st-century sightings
 On the night of July 22, 2008, about 11:27 p.m, CCTV footage of a lemonade factory in Nong Suea District, Pathum Thani Province captured quite clearly an alleged Krasue. The Krasue appears near one side of the factory wall adjacent to the field. When a smartphone's camera was used to take a shot of the CCTV footage in order to zoom at it closer, an old woman living alone in that area was seen in the image. Local people insist that they see strange lights and hear strange sounds at night for about a year. However, when the old woman seen in the image died, sightings of the Krasue reportedly stopped. Asst. Prof. Dr. Chawan Koopipat, an expert in photography and video technology from Chulalongkorn University checked the CCTV footage and determined that it was not edited. According to the professor, the Krasue in the CCTV footage probably was a result of the lighting, which has movement on the upper part and reflecting on the bottom wet and damp area of the land that was not farmed giving the illusion of a Krasue.
 Strange red lights floating up the paddy fields in the area of Phachi District, Ayutthaya Province, near Wat Tako were sighted in mid-June 2014 and was believed to be from a Krasue. Soon after, hundreds of teenagers (in some nights ranging to thousands) flocked in the area reportedly to prove the truth. This has caused damage to this field. The landlord insists that there are no Krasue here and the lights seen were actually a floating lantern bird chaser.
 In September 2015, one image was shared on online social networks allegedly shot at Ban Phai village, in the area of Chae Hom District, Lampang Province, depicting a Krasue that has guts and internal organs trapped with thorny branches. However, the villagers denied the report and clarified that there was no village named Ban Phai at the area.
 The death of a great number of chickens from mysterious circumstances at a farm in Nakhon Luang District, Ayutthaya Province, on the night of October 4, 2015 was blamed by local villagers on the activity of the Krasue.
 In February 2016, at Ban Don Pho Thong, Mueang Suphan Buri District, Suphan Buri Province, some villagers found strange lights floating at night which they believed to be a Krasue. This news has caused many people to panic.
 In May 2016, villagers at Ban Khok Ta Kerd, Mueang Surin District, Surin Province saw strange green and red lights rising up and down the paddy fields at night.
 In early August 2016 at Ban Song Yang, Mueang Amnat Charoen District, Amnat Charoen Province, video clips from smartphone cameras shot by individuals in the area showed red lights floating at night, believed to be a Krasue.
 At approximately 9:30 p.m., on 13 September 2016, CCTV footage from a house in the Tha Ruea District, Ayutthaya Province, captured strange lights. The woman owner of the house who first reviewed the CCTV footage said she was watching television at that time, and she heard a loud barking dog. She went out to check the source of the sound but she did not see anything, so she looked at the CCTV monitor. She saw the strange lights which she watched for almost an hour, until the lights floated in the fence of her house and moved near the chicken coop and the star gooseberry tree. She became scared and called her neighbor, along with her father and her two other employees, whom she all asked to help her investigate the lights. However, they found nothing. She said that at the time of the event, there was bad weather during two to three days, it's sprinkling and nighttime comes faster than normal. After another 10 days at 8:28 p.m. on September 23, she saw the lights in the backyard again. This time she asked her son to investigate the lights, but he found nothing. Her neighbors believed that the lights were from a Krasue. At that time, there were chickens and cats that the villagers were missing for unknown reasons. However, according to Dr. Jessada Denduangboripant, a skeptic, the strange lights actually came from the flashlight held by someone in front of the house. This explanation however was rejected by the television program reporting the incident.
 By the end of 2016, one image has been shared on online social networks in Thailand. The image was shot in Buachet District, Surin Province, and shows an entity that looks like a human's face on a tree at night nearby a light. The image is believed to be depicting a Krasue.
The video shows that the light has already floated away. A man reported that at the time he lived in Yang Talat District, he would frequent the woods at night and while at the woods he looked at the sky and saw a Krasue. According to him, he cannot see the Krasue's face because it was covered by long hair, but he can make out the long fangs and the bright lights. It was reportedly able to escape when he drew his gun to shoot it.
 In mid-July 2017 a video clip was shared on online social networks, showing an alleged entity floating in the air at the same level as a tree in the area at night. The entity was being witnessed by either a security guard or a police officer standing and looking with suspicion. There is no information as to where the video came from, and no additional details were available. However, it was found out that the entity was actually a drone, decorated as a man's face as a hoax.

Krasue references in Thai culture

There is information from The Royal Academy which provides examples of how belief in the Krasue has been reflected in Thai culture for centuries, for example:
An abnormally tiny banana (caused by a mutation) is said to be eaten by a Krasue.
A gluttonous person who eats too fast is usually said to  "eat like a Krasue" or to be "as gluttonous as Krasue".
Glowing mushroom in Khonkaen province is called “ Krasue Mushroom".
In Chonburi province, there is a village named “ Nong Krasue" (Krasue marsh). Now, the name has been changed to “ Nong Krasaem" (Happiness marsh) to make it less scary.

Scientific explanation
A possible scientific explanation is that Krasue sightings are caused by blazing flames from methane gas particles emitted from rotten organic matters such as found in farms and fields, where Krasue sightings are commonly reported. However, according to Associate Professor Dr. Sirintornthep Towprayoon, an energy researcher from King Mongkut's University of Technology Thonburi, the hypothesis that the Krasue is actually burning methane gas particles is impossible because not enough methane is emitted from rotten organic matter to be able to cause an ignition and that even if the methane gas particles did ignite, the burning would be confined to the surface of the organic, flammable matter and will not lead to floating flames that allegedly give the illusion of the Krasue.
An anatomical interpretation is that when the head is pulled off from the human body, other organs such as the intestines, heart, and lungs will not come together with the head.

Media
Countries where the Krasue tale is popular have adapted it to film. Several Thai films depict this spirit, including 1973 movie Krasue Sao (Ghosts of Guts Eater),  with Sombat Metanee, which features a fight between two Krasues, Krasue krahai lveat/Filth Eating Spirit  (1985) Itthirit Nam Man Phrai  (Oil of Eternal Life) made in 1984, with Tanid Pongmanoon and Praew Mardmarud, Krasue Kat Pop  (1990) with Bin Bunluerit and Trirak Rakkarndee, Krasue Krahailueat (Bloodthirsty Krasue), made in 1995 with Thida Teerarat, Tamnan Krasue  (Demonic Beauty) released in 2002, which ties the Krasue to a Khmer curse;  Krasue Valentine (2006) by Yuthlert Sippapak, Krasue (The Gluttonous Fear)  made in 2007, with Jedsada Roongsakorn and Sirintorn Parnsamutr, Krasue Fat Pop  (2009) with Chutima Naiyana, in which Krasue fights against Phi Pop, and Fullmoon Devil (2011)  by Komson Thripong. Krasue also appears in erotic movies such as Krasue Rak Krasue Sawat (2014)  and Wan Krasue Sao (2013)  In all these movies Krasue plays a central role, but she also appears in many other movies in lesser roles, such as in Phi Ta Wan Kap Achan Ta Bo (2008) , among others. More recently, the Krasue appears in the 2019 horror film Inhuman Kiss (Thai: แสงกระสือ), and its 2023 sequel, Inhuman Kiss 2, scheduled for theatrical release in Thailand on 30 March 2023.

Krasue, as Ahp (also spelt Arp or Aap), is present in the Cambodian horror films Neang Arp (Lady Vampire) (2004), Tiyen Arp រឿង ទាយាទអាប (Heredity of Krasue) (2007), Arp Kalum (The Sexiest Ahp) (2009) and Phlerng Chhes Arp Ahp Wearing A Helmet Season 1 រឿង អាបពាក់មួកសុវត្ថិភាព វគ្គ១ Ahp Wearing A Helmet Season 2 រឿង អាបពាក់មួកសុវត្ថិភាព វគ្គ2 (Released in 2012) Hong Kong's Witch with the Flying Head (飛頭魔女) (1977), which includes a Krasue spitting flames and firing laser beams and that was dubbed in Thai as Krasue Sawat (กระสือสวาท), meaning "Lovely Krasue",  and Indonesia's Mystics in Bali (1981) also feature local versions of Krasue. In the Vietnam War-era drama Freedom Deal by Camerado, President Nixon orders the 1970 military incursion into Cambodia, unwittingly unleashing a legion of local ghosts similar to the Krasue.

This ghost appears periodically in Thai television soap operas (ละคร). Krasue, a popular lakhon aired between 20 December 1994 and 21 March 1995, as well as the more recent Krasue Mahanakhon (กระสือมหานคร) —in which the ghost story for a change is against a background of young city people instead of the usual rural or traditional setting— feature a Krasue in the central role. The theme song of the 1994 Krasue TV soap opera became very famous. There was a remake in 2011 named Krasue Cham Sin (กระสือจำศีล), but it was poorly cast and produced, not being able to reach the popularity of the 1994 lakhon. A Krasue has been also comically featured in a Sylvania light bulb commercial for Thai audiences and in a more recent dietary supplement ad. A rather ugly Krasue also appears in the animated film Nak.

Representations of Krasue, often humorous, are very common in Thai comic books.Comic page

Since this ghost is a popular subject in some places of Southeast Asia, especially in Thailand, there are even costumes, dolls, keyholders and lamps in Krasue form,in the Siamese war.

A Krasue features as the main antagonist of the 2013 horror game Eyes: The Horror Game. This interpretation shows the Krasue as a woman who was abused by her husband to the point of death, being reincarnated as a ghost to enact revenge. The Krasue lurks around an abandoned mansion, where the player acts as the role of a thief, where they must retrieve an allocated amount of money bags (depends on difficulty), before being able to leave. The game's story-line, has some reference to the original folktale story, as the story talks of a "curse", and "flames", which is supposedly trapped in a photo.

A Krasue was also featured in the Creepshow episode "Drug Traffic". It appears in the form of a sickly girl named Mai (portrayed by Sarah Jon) who has to keep taking special medication or else her Krasue form will emerge.

See also
Dullahan
Onryō
Hungry ghost
Leyak
Langsuyar
Nukekubi
Manananggal (Philippine mythology)
Penanggalan (Malay culture)
Thai folklore
Vengeful ghost

 References 

Bibliography
Chutima Pragatwutisarn (2010) (ชุติมา ประกาศวุฒิสาร), Evil Woman in a Beautiful Body: Femininity and the Crisis of Modernity in Thai Society, Chulalongkorn University
Baumann, Benjamin (2013) Tamnan Krasue - Constructing a Khmer Ghost for a Thai Film. in: Kyoto Review of Southeast Asia (14)
Baumann, Benjamin (2014) "From Filth-Ghost to Khmer-Witch: Phi Krasue’s Changing Cinematic Construction and its Symbolism", in: Horror Studies'' 5(2), pp. 183–196
Baumann, Benjamin (2016) "The Khmer Witch Project: Demonizing the Khmer by Khmerizing a Demon", in: Bräunlein and Lauser (eds.) Ghost Movies in Southeast Asia and Beyond.  Leiden: Brill. pp. 141–183
Baumann, Benjamin. 2020. "Thai Monsters. Phi Krasue: Inhuman Kiss (Mogkolsiri, 2019)." In Monsters. A Companion, edited by Simon Bacon, 101-9. Oxford Peter Lang.

External links
Tamnan Krasue-Constructing a Khmer Ghost for a Thai Film
Macula's illustration of (krasue) 

Southeast Asian culture
Thai ghosts
Laotian legendary creatures
Cambodian legendary creatures
Mythological hematophages
Female legendary creatures
Cambodian legends
Mythological monsters
Monsters